Trichonis is a Neotropical genus of butterflies in the family Lycaenidae. 

One species, Trichonis immaculata, is a small blue butterfly found in the West Indies. The outer edges of the forewings are dark blue with the remainder of the wings being a light blue. They are about 30 mm wide and 25 mm long.

Other species share the "dark around the edges" effect.

Species
Trichonis hyacinthus (Cramer, [1775])
Trichonis immaculata Lathy, 1930

References

Eumaeini
Lycaenidae of South America
Lycaenidae genera
Taxa named by William Chapman Hewitson